Sablin (from сабля meaning sabre) is a Russian masculine surname, its feminine counterpart is Sablina. Notable people with the surname include:

 Anna Sablina (born 1945), Russian speed skater
 Artyom Sablin (born 1995), Russian football player
 Mikhail Sablin (1869–1920), Russian Admiral
 Nikolai Sablin (c.1850–1881), Russian revolutionary
 Nikolai Pavlovich Sablin, Russian naval officer, brother of Mikhail
 Valery Sablin (1939–1976), Soviet Captain 3rd Rank
 Yuriy Sablin (1897–1937), Russian military leader, a Socialist Revolutionary

Other uses 

 Sablin, Kursk Oblast, a rural locality in Russia

Russian-language surnames